Tirza is a 2010 Dutch drama film directed by Rudolf van den Berg and based on the Dutch bestseller of the same name by Arnon Grunberg. The film was selected as the Dutch entry for the Best Foreign Language Film at the 83rd Academy Awards but it didn't make the final shortlist.

Cast
 Gijs Scholten van Aschat as Jörgen
 Sylvia Hoeks as Tirza
 Johanna ter Steege as Alma
 Abbey Hoes as Ibi
 Titia Hoogendoorn as Ester
 Nasrdin Dchar as Choukri
 Keitumetse Matlabo as Kaisa

Production
In retrospect, Abbey Hoes thinks she "should not have done" some of the nude scenes she has done in the past. "I've been on mokkels.nl since I was fourteen because of my role in the film Tirza." The actress tells in conversation with a magazine that there are people who think that "it's part of the game" if you are an actress. "But I don't think being on a dirty porn site is part of the job. If I had wanted that, I would have become a porn actress."

See also
 List of submissions to the 83rd Academy Awards for Best Foreign Language Film
 List of Dutch submissions for the Academy Award for Best Foreign Language Film

References

External links

2010 films
2010 drama films
Dutch drama films
2010s Dutch-language films
Films set in Namibia
Films directed by Rudolf van den Berg